Kadija may refer to:

Kadija Sesay, British literary activist, short story writer and poet of Sierra Leonean descent
Branko Kadija (1921-1942), Albanian communist of Serbian descent, People's Hero of Albania

See also
Kadia (disambiguation)
Khadija (name)